Xestia okakensis is a species of cutworm or dart moth in the family Noctuidae.

The MONA or Hodges number for Xestia okakensis is 10939.

Subspecies
These two subspecies belong to the species Xestia okakensis:
 Xestia okakensis morandi (Benjamin, 1934)
 Xestia okakensis okakensis (Packard, 1867)

References

Further reading

 
 
 

Xestia
Articles created by Qbugbot
Moths described in 1867